Tomb of Jani Khan, or Khan-i-Khanan, is a historical tomb of Jani Khan. It is situated in Baghbanpura, Lahore, Punjab, Pakistan.

History
The tomb was constructed during the Mughal rule in South Asia. Jani Khan was the father-in-law of Moin-ul-Mulk, the Mughal governor, who died in 1778. There are three graves inside the tomb.

Gallery

References

Mausoleums in Punjab, Pakistan
History of Punjab
Monuments and memorials in Punjab, Pakistan
Buildings and structures in Punjab, Pakistan